This is a list of presidents of the Virgin Islands Legislature:

Sources
 Official website of the Virgin Islands Legislature

Politics of the United States Virgin Islands
Virgin Islands

Virgin Islands
United States Virgin Islands
Presidents of the Virgin Islands Legislature